Flensburg (Danish and ;) is an independent town in the north of the German state of Schleswig-Holstein. Flensburg is the north of the region of Schleswig. After Kiel and Lübeck, it is the third largest town in Schleswig-Holstein.

The nearest larger towns are Kiel ( south) and Odense in Denmark ( northeast).

Known for
In Germany, Flensburg is known for:
 the Kraftfahrt-Bundesamt (roughly: National Driver and Vehicle Register) with its Verkehrssünderkartei (literally: "traffic sinner card file"), where details of traffic offences are stored
 its beer Flensburger Pilsener, also called "Flens"
 the centre of the Danish national minority in Germany
 the greeting Moin Moin
 the large erotic mail-order companies Beate Uhse and Orion
 its handball team  SG Flensburg-Handewitt
 the Naval Academy at Mürwik 
 being the final seat of the Third Reich from 1 May 1945 following the death of Adolf Hitler, until the final, formal dissolution of the Third Reich in early June of that year.

Geography

Flensburg is situated in the north of the German state Schleswig-Holstein, very close to the German-Danish border. After Westerland on the island of Sylt it is Germany's northernmost town. Flensburg lies at the innermost tip of the Flensburg Firth, an inlet of the Baltic Sea. Flensburg's eastern shore is part of the Anglia peninsula.

Neighbouring municipalities
Clockwise from the northeast, beginning at the German shore of the Flensburg Firth, the following communities in Schleswig-Flensburg district and Denmark's Southern Denmark Region all border on Flensburg:

Glücksburg (Amt-free town), Wees (Amt Langballig), Maasbüll, Hürup, Tastrup and Freienwill (all in Amt Hürup), Jarplund-Weding, Handewitt (Amt Handewitt), Harrislee (Amt-free community) and Aabenraa Municipality on the Danish shore of the Flensburg Firth.

Constituent communities
The town of Flensburg is divided into 13 communities, which themselves are further divided into 38 statistical areas. Constituent communities have a two-digit number and the statistical areas a three-digit number.

The communities with their statistical areas:

History

Middle Ages

Flensburg was founded at the latest by 1200 at the innermost end of the Flensburg Firth by Danish settlers, who were soon joined by German merchants. In 1284, its town rights were confirmed and the town quickly rose to become one of the most important in the Duchy of Schleswig. Unlike Holstein, however, Schleswig did not belong to the German Holy Roman Empire. Therefore, Flensburg was not a member of the Hanseatic League, but it did maintain contacts with this important trading network.

Historians presume that there were several reasons for choosing this spot for settlement:
Shelter from heavy winds
Trade route between Holstein and North Jutland (namely the Hærvejen or Ochsenweg, a name for a series of roads between Hamburg, Schleswig-Holstein and Jutland, possibly dating from the Bronze Age)
 The Angelnway: Trade route between North Frisia and Angeln
A good herring fishery

Herrings, especially kippered, were what brought about the blossoming of the town's trade in the Middle Ages. They were sent inland and to almost every European country.

On 28 October 1412, Queen Margaret I of Denmark died of the Plague aboard a ship in Flensburg Harbour.

From time to time plagues such as bubonic plague, caused mainly by rat fleas (Xenopsylla cheopis, a parasite found on brown rats), "red" dysentery and other scourges killed a great deal of Flensburg's population. Lepers were strictly isolated, namely at the St.-Jürgen-Hospital (Helligåndshospital, built before 1290), which lay far outside the town's gates, where the St. Jürgen Church is nowadays. About 1500, syphilis also appeared. The church hospital "Zum Heiligen Geist" ("To the Holy Ghost") stood in Große Straße, now Flensburg's pedestrian precinct.

A Flensburger's everyday life was very hard, and the old roads and paths were bad. The main streets were neither paved nor lit at night. When the streets became really bad, the citizens had to make the dung-filled streets passable with wooden pathways. Only the few upper-class houses had windows. In 1485, a great fire struck Flensburg. Storm tides also beset the town occasionally. Every household in the town kept livestock in the house and the yard. Townsfolk furthermore had their own cowherds and a swineherd.

Early modern times
After the fall of the Hanseatic League in the 16th century, Flensburg was said to be one of the most important trading towns in the Scandinavian area. Flensburg merchants were active as far away as the Mediterranean, Greenland and the Caribbean. The most important commodities, after herring, were sugar and whale oil, the latter from whaling off Greenland. However, the Thirty Years' War put an end to this boom time. The town was becoming Protestant and thereby ever more German culturally and linguistically, while the neighbouring countryside remained decidedly Danish.

In the 18th century, thanks to the rum trade, Flensburg had yet another boom. Cane sugar was imported from the Danish West Indies (now the US Virgin Islands) and refined in Flensburg. Only in the 19th century, as a result of industrialization, was the town at last outstripped by the competition from cities such as Copenhagen and Hamburg.

The rum produced in Flensburg then became re-integrated into West Indian trade routes, which as of 1864 moved away from the Danish West Indies to the British colony of Jamaica instead. It was imported from there, blended, and sold all over Europe. There is nowadays only one active rum distillery in Flensburg, "A. H. Johannsen".

History as a German town
Between 1460 and 1864, Flensburg was, after Copenhagen, the second biggest port in the Kingdom of Denmark, but it passed to the Kingdom of Prussia after the Second Schleswig War in 1864. The Battle of Flensburg was on February 6, 1864: near the city a small Hungarian mounted regiment chased a Danish infantry and Dragoon regiment. There is still a considerable Danish community in the town today. Some estimates put the percentage of Flensburgers who belong to it as high as 25%; other estimates put that percentage much lower. The SSW political party representing the minority usually gains 20–25% of the votes in local elections, but by no means are all of its voters Danes. Before 1864, more than 50% belonged to what is now the minority, witnessed even today by the great number of Danish surnames in the Flensburg telephone directory (Asmussen, Claussen, Jacobsen, Jensen, Petersen, etc.). The upper classes and the learned at that time, however, were German, and since 1864, the German language has prevailed in the town.

On 1 April 1889, Flensburg became an independent city (kreisfreie Stadt) within the Province of Schleswig-Holstein, and at the same time still kept its status as seat of the Flensburg district. In 1920, the League of Nations decided that the matter of the German-Danish border would be settled by a vote. As a result of the plebiscite, and the way the voting zones were laid out, some of Flensburg's northern neighbourhoods were ceded to Denmark, whereas Flensburg as a whole voted with a great majority to stay in Germany.

In return for this great pro-German majority, the town of Flensburg was given a large hall, the "Deutsches Haus", which was endowed by the government as "thanks for German loyalty".

During the Second World War, the town was left almost unscathed by the air raids that devastated other German cities. However, in 1943, 20 children died when their nursery school was bombed, and shortly after the war ended, an explosion at a local munitions storage site claimed many victims.

In 1945, Admiral Karl Dönitz, who was briefly President (Reichspräsident) of Nazi Germany once Adolf Hitler had appointed him his successor and then killed himself, fled to Flensburg with what was left of his government. The so-called Flensburg government, led by Karl Dönitz, was in power from 1 May, the announcement of Hitler's death, for one week, until German troops surrendered and the town was occupied by Allied troops. The regime was effectively dissolved on 23 May when the British Army arrested Dönitz and his ministers in Mürwik and detained them in the Navy School in Mürwik. The dissolution was formalized by the Berlin Declaration which was promulgated on 5 June. Flensburg was therefore, for a few weeks, the seat of the last Third Reich government.

Since the Second World War
After the Second World War, the town's population broke the 100,000 mark for a short time, thereby making Flensburg a city (Großstadt) under one traditional definition. The population later sank below that mark, however.

In the years after the Second World War, there was in South Schleswig, particularly in Flensburg, a strong pro-Danish movement connected with the idea of the "Eider Politics". Its goal was for the town and all or most of Schleswig, the whole area north of the Eider River, to be united with Denmark. After 1945, Flensburg's town council was for years dominated by Danish parties, and the town had a Danish mayor.

The town profited from the planned location of military installations. Since the German Reunification, the number of soldiers has dropped to about 8,000. Since Denmark's entry into the European Economic Community (now the European Union), border trade has played an important role in Flensburg's economic life. Some Danish businesses, such as Danfoss, have set up shop just south of the border for tax reasons.

In 1970, the Flensburg district was expanded to include the municipalities in the Amt of Medelby, formerly in the Südtondern district, and in 1974 it was united with the Schleswig district to form the district of Schleswig-Flensburg, whose district seat was the town of Schleswig. Flensburg thereby lost its function as a district seat, but it remained an independent (district-free) town.

Amalgamations
Until the middle of the 19th century Flensburg's municipal area comprised a total area of 2 639 ha. Beginning in 1874, however, the following communities or rural areas (Gemarkungen) were annexed to the town of Flensburg:

Population development
Population figures are for respective municipal areas through time. Until 1870, figures are mostly estimates, and thereafter census results (¹) or official projections from either statistical offices or the town administration itself.

¹ Census results

Danish minority

The Danish minority in Flensburg and the surrounding towns run their own schools, libraries and Lutheran churches from which the German majority is not excluded. The co-existence of these two groups is considered a sound and healthy symbiosis. There is a form of mixed Danish–German used on the ferries, Petuh.

There is also a Danish Consulate-General in Flensburg.

In Denmark, Flensburg seems to be mainly known for its "border shops" where, among other things, spirits, beer and candy can be purchased at cheaper prices than in Denmark. The prices are lower because the value-added tax is lower and excise taxes are either lower (e.g. on alcohol) or do not exist (on e.g. sugar). Currently the border shops are able to sell canned beer to persons resident in Scandinavia without paying deposits as long as the beverage is not consumed in Germany.

Politics
The town council was led for centuries by two mayors, one for the north town (St. Marien) and the other for the south town (St. Nikolai and St. Johannis). The council members and the mayors were chosen by the council itself, that is, retiring officials had their successors named by the remaining councillors in such a way that both halves of the town had as many members. These councillors usually bore the title "Senator".

This "town government" lasted until 1742 when the "northern mayor" was made the "directing mayor" by the Danish King. From this position came what was later known as the First Mayor. The second mayor simply bore the title "mayor" ("Bürgermeister"). After the town had been ceded to Prussia, the mayors were elected by the townsfolk as of 1870, and the First Mayor was given the title Oberbürgermeister, still the usual title in German towns and cities. During the Third Reich, the town head was appointed by those who held power locally at the time.

In 1945, after the Second World War, a twofold leadership based on a British model was introduced. Heading the town stood foremost the Oberbürgermeister, who was chosen by the town council and whose job was as chairman of council and the municipality. Next to him was an Oberstadtdirektor ("Higher Town Director") who was leader of administration. In 1950, when Schleswig-Holstein brought its new laws for municipalities into force, the title Oberbürgermeister was transferred (once again) to this latter official. At first, and for a while, he was chosen by the council. Since that time, the former official has been called the Stadtpräsident ("Town President"), and is likewise chosen by the council after each municipal election. However, since 1999, the Oberbürgermeister has been chosen directly by the voters as once before.

The first directly elected Oberbürgermeister Hermann Stell died on 4 May 2004 of a stroke. On 14 November of the same year, the independent candidate suggested by the CDU Klaus Tscheuschner was elected to replace Stell with 59% of the vote. In the municipal election in 2003, Hans Hermann Laturnus was elected Stadtpräsident.

In the municipal election of 2008, the local list WiF (Wir in Flensburg) was elected largest group in the Council Assembly of Flensburg, with its 10 city councillors out of 43, closely followed by the South Schleswig Voter Federation (Südschleswigscher Wählerverband) (9 councillors) and the CDU (9 councillors). Also elected was the SPD (seven councillors), the Greens (3 councillors), the Left (3 councillors) and the FDP (2 councillors). Nevertheless, since the WiF-group was divided into two different caucuses, the SSW-group has been the largest group in the Council Assembly. The current City President is Dr. Christian Dewanger (WiF).

In the mayoral election of 2010, Simon Faber (SSW) was elected Lord Mayor of the town in a run-off election with 54.8% of the vote. He was the first person from the Danish Minority to occupy this office since the end of World War II.

Mayor
The current Mayor of Flensburg is Simone Lange of the Social Democratic Party (SPD), who was elected in 2016. She took office on 15 January 2017.

The most recent mayoral election was held on 5 June 2016, and the results were as follows:

! colspan=2| Candidate
! Party
! Votes
! %
|-
| bgcolor=| 
| align=left| Simone Lange
| align=left| Social Democratic Party
| 12,103
| 51.4
|-
| bgcolor=| 
| align=left| Simon Faber
| align=left| South Schleswig Voters' Association
| 5,363
| 22.8
|-
| bgcolor=| 
| align=left| Kay Richert
| align=left| Free Democratic Party
| 4,156
| 17.6
|-
| bgcolor=| 
| align=left| Jens Drews
| align=left| Independent
| 1,945
| 8.3
|-
! colspan=3| Valid votes
! 23,567
! 99.4
|-
! colspan=3| Invalid votes
! 137
! 0.6
|-
! colspan=3| Total
! 23,704
! 100.0
|-
! colspan=3| Electorate/voter turnout
! 76,421
! 31.0
|-
| colspan=5| Source: City of Flensburg
|}

City council

The Flensburg city council governs the city alongside the Mayor. The most recent city council election was held on 6 May 2018, and the results were as follows:

! colspan=2| Party
! Votes
! %
! +/-
! Seats
! +/-
|-
| bgcolor=| 
| align=left| Christian Democratic Union (CDU)
| 5,233
| 19.4
|  2.7
| 8
|  2
|-
| bgcolor=| 
| align=left| Alliance 90/The Greens (Grüne)
| 5,088
| 18.8
|  6.3
| 8
|  3
|-
| bgcolor=| 
| align=left| Social Democratic Party (SPD)
| 4,930
| 18.2
|  2.5
| 8
|  1
|-
| bgcolor=| 
| align=left| South Schleswig Voters' Association (SSW)
| 4,756
| 17.6
|  1.4
| 8
| ±0
|-
| 
| align=left| We in Flensburg (WiF)
| 2,320
| 8.6
|  6.4
| 4
|  2
|-
| bgcolor=| 
| align=left| Free Democratic Party (FDP)
| 2,087
| 7.7
|  3.6
| 3
|  1
|-
| bgcolor=| 
| align=left| The Left (Die Linke)
| 2,021
| 7.5
|  3.8
| 3
|  1
|-
| 
| align=left| Flensburg Votes! (FLW)
| 599
| 2.2
|  0.7
| 1
| ±0
|-
! colspan=2| Valid votes
! 27,034
! 98.9
! 
! 
! 
|-
! colspan=2| Invalid votes
! 288
! 1.1
! 
! 
! 
|-
! colspan=2| Total
! 27,322
! 100.0
! 
! 43
! ±0
|-
! colspan=2| Electorate/voter turnout
! 76,827
! 35.6
!  0.3
! 
! 
|-
| colspan=7| Source: City of Flensburg
|}

Coat of arms
Flensburg's coat of arms shows in gold above blue and silver waves rising to the left a six-sided red tower with a blue pointed roof breaking out of which, one above the other are the two lions of Schleswig and Denmark; above is a red shield with the silver Holsatian nettle leaf on it. The town's flag is blue, overlaid with the coat of arms in colour.

The lions symbolize Schleswig, and the nettle leaf Holstein, thus expressing the town's unity with these two historic lands. The tower recalls Flensburg's old town rights and the old castle that was the town's namesake (Burg means "castle" in German). The waves refer to the town's position on the Flensburg Fjord.

The coat of arms was granted the town by King Wilhelm II of Prussia in 1901, and once again in modified, newly approved form on 19 January 1937 by Schleswig-Holstein's High President (Oberpräsident)

Twin towns – sister cities

Flensburg is twinned with:
 Carlisle, England, United Kingdom
 Neubrandenburg, Germany
 Słupsk, Poland

Economy and infrastructure

Energy

The town has a well established Combined Heat and Power and District Heating scheme which was installed between 1970 and 1980. It is owned by the town.

Transport
West of Flensburg runs the A 7 Autobahn, leading north to the Danish border, whence it continues as European route E45. Furthermore, Federal Highways (Bundesstraßen) B 200 and B 199 pass through the municipal area.

Also west of the town lies the Flensburg-Schäferhaus airport.

Local transport is provided by several buslines such as "Aktiv Bus GmbH" and "Allgemeinen Flensburger Autobus Gesellschaft" (AFAG) along with others. They all operate within an integrated fare system within the Flensburg transport community (Verkehrsgemeinschaft Flensburg). They also all subscribe to the Schleswig-Holstein tariff system whereby anyone travelling from anywhere in Schleswig-Holstein or Hamburg may use Flensburg buses free to connect with their final destinations. It works both ways, of course, and a rider boarding any bus in Flensburg need only name his destination anywhere in Schleswig-Holstein or Hamburg, pay his fare, and travel all the way to that destination on the one ticket.

The current Flensburg station was opened in 1927 south of the Old Town. From there, trains run on the main line to Neumünster and on to Hamburg and to Fredericia, among them some InterCity connections as well as trains serving the line running to Eckernförde and Kiel. Another stop for regional trains to Neumünster is to be found in Flensburg-Weiche. The stretch of line to Niebüll has been out of service since 1981, efforts to open it again notwithstanding. The secondary line to Husum and the lesser lines to Kappeln and Satrup no longer exist. Even the tramway, which opened in 1881 to horse-drawn trams, was electrified in 1906 and at one point ran four lines was replaced with buses in 1973.

Media

In Flensburg, the Flensburger Tageblatt, from the Schleswig-Holsteinischer Zeitungsverlag (newspaper publisher) is published daily, as is the bilingual (German and Danish) Flensborg Avis. There are also two weekly advertising flyers, "MoinMoin" (named for a common regional greeting) and "Wochenschau" ("Newsreel") as well as an illustrated town paper ("Flensburg Journal"), the Flensburg "campus newspaper" and a town magazine ("Partout"). Norddeutscher Rundfunk (NDR) runs one of its oldest studios right near the Deutsches Haus. Flensburg is the site of a number of radio transmission facilities: on the Fuchsberg in the community of Engelsby, Norddeutscher Rundfunk runs a transmission facility for VHF, television and medium wave. A cage aerial is mounted on a  guyed, earthed steel-lattice mast. This transmitter is successor to the Flensburg transmitter through which the announcement of Germany's surrender was broadcast on 8 May 1945.

The broadcasting tower on the Fuchsberg is used for the programmes of Norddeutscher Rundfunk and Danmarks Radio while the countrywide VHF radio programmes of R.SH, delta radio, Deutschlandfunk and Deutschlandradio are aired from the Flensburg-Freienwill tower.

Flensburg has no local transmitter of its own because Schleswig-Holstein's state broadcasting laws only allow transmitters that broadcast statewide. From 1993 to 1996, "Radio Flensburg" tried to establish a local Flensburg radio station by using a local transmitter just across the border in Denmark. It had to be shut down, however, owing to the Danish transmitter's own financial problems. From October 2006 Radio Flensburg broadcast as an internet radio.

The "Offener Kanal" ("Open Channel") shows programmes made by local citizens seven days a week, mostly in the evenings, and can also be seen on cable television.

Public institutions
Flensburg is home to the following institutions:
Handwerkskammer Flensburg (Chamber of Skilled Crafts)
IHK Flensburg (Chamber of Trade and Industry)
Kraftfahrt-Bundesamt (federal government office for road traffic)

Education
 University of Flensburg with about 6,000 students (2019/20); founded in 1946 as a Pedagogical College, raised to university in 1994. Unlike the much larger University of Kiel it is not a full university – theology, medicine, law and some other programs are not offered here. The college does, however, have the right to confer doctorates.
 Fachhochschule Flensburg, a Fachhochschule with more than 3,000 students; in 1886 a royal steamship machinist school was established, out of which developed a ship's engineers' school. From this grew the Fachhochschule for Technology, which was converted into the current Fachhochschule Flensburg in 1973, at which time the economics programme was also introduced.
 Marineschule Mürwik (Naval Academy at Mürwik), main educational establishment for all German Navy officers.
 Flensburger Volkshochschule (German Folk high school)
 Voksenundervisningen (Danish)

Also on hand in Flensburg is a complete range of training and professional schools, including a number of Danish ones. Flensburg is home to Schleswig-Holstein's Central State Library, a university library, a town bookshop and the Danish Central Library for South Schleswig. The last named offers not only intensive courses in Danish, but also, with its "Slesvigsk samling" collection, a vast repository of unique material about the border area's history and culture. Flensburg has an extensive town archive. The Danish minority's archive is housed at the Danish Central Library.

Culture and sightseeing

Theatre
 Schleswig-Holsteinisches Landestheater (at the Stadttheater) and Symphony Orchestra
 Niederdeutsche Bühne der Stadt Flensburg ("Low German Stage of the city of Flensburg")
 Det Lille Teater (Danish theatre)
 Theaterwerkstatt Pilkentafel (Theatre Workshop)
 Orpheus-Theater

Archives and libraries
 Town Archive, a very comprehensive collection, at the town hall
 Dansk Centralbibliotek for Sydslesvig, with archive of the Danish minority and Schleswig book collection
 Town Library
 State Central Library and Zentrale Hochschulbibliothek (Central College Library)

Museums
 Museumsberg – Museum for artistic and cultural history.
 Schifffahrtsmuseum – Museum for shipping and shipbuilding.
 Rummuseum – History of the "Rum Town" of Flensburg.
 Naturwissenschaftliches Museum – Animal and plant worlds of northern Schleswig-Holstein.
 Museumshafen – Private initiative for maintaining old traditional working boats mainly from the Baltics (Segelschiffe).
 Museumswerft – Shipbuilding (sail) of bygone centuries. The place also has a children's boatyard.
 Fischereimuseum – Initiative of the fishery association, lies on the old fishery harbour.
 Phänomenta – For experiencing and understanding nature and technology.
 Salondampfer "Alexandra" – Passenger Steamer built 1908. The "Alexandra" regularly makes small trips in the Flensburg Förde (Bay)
 Klassische Yachten Flensburg – Classic Yacht Harbour. Private Initiative to present classic yachts typical for the Baltics.
 Gerichtshistorische Sammlung – a collection of legal history at the Flensburg State Court.
 Bergmühle – Association for maintaining the historic windmill from 1792.
 Johannesburger Heimatstube – Documents, pictures and writings from East Prussia.

Buildings

Flensburg has a well preserved Old Town with many things to see from centuries gone by. Characteristic is the row along the waterfront. Three of the four old town cores are found along this north–south axis. The building boom in Imperial times led to a partial rebuilding of the Old Town, but without destroying its structure, and rather leading to notable expansion of the town. Virtually unscathed in the Second World War, Flensburg, like other places in Germany, adopted a policy of getting rid of old buildings and building anew in the style of the times. This trend was limited in Flensburg by a lack of money, but before the policy was finally stopped in the late 1970s, countless old buildings had been demolished in the north and east Old Town to be replaced by newer structures. Despite great losses, Flensburg still comes across as having a compact, well preserved Old Town in the valley with good additions to what was built in the founders' time on the surrounding heights.

Johanniskirche (Flensburg) Johanniskirche (Johannischurch), town's oldest church in the innertown, 12th century
Marienkirche (Flensburg) Marienkirche, High Gothic, Baroque additions, tower from 1885, well decorated
Nikolaikirche (Flensburg) Nikolaikirche, Gothic main church, famous organ design by Hinrich Ringeringk
Heiliggeistkirche (Flensburg) Heiliggeistkirche (Danish: Helligåndskirken), former chapel of the Hospital zum Heiligen Geist
Franziskanerkloster Flensburg Franziskanerkloster, ruins from 1263
Nordertor, a gate, and the town's landmark
Kompagnietor another gate, built in 1602, shipping company and harbour gate
Alt-Flensburger Haus, where the Eckener brothers' parents lived, Norderstraße 8
Flensborghus, a former orphanage, today seat of the Danish minority, Norderstraße 76
Many merchants' houses running from the main streets Holm-Große Straße-Norderstraße, the town's greatest architectural attraction
Südermarkt 9 (market) with the town's oldest house
Nordermarkt (market) with the Schrangen (market hall) and Neptunbrunnen (fountain)
Rote Straße with nice craftsmen's houses
Jürgenstraße with the Gängeviertel ("Warren Neighbourhood", i.e. with very dense building and narrow streets), former suburb.
Oluf-Samson-Gang, picturesque lane with little half-timbered houses, Flensburg's historic red light district.
Row of warehouses
Ship bridge (Schiffbrücke), a long quay on the harbour
Scanty ruins of the town wall, at the Nikolaikirche and at the Franciscan friary
Bergmühle and Johannismühle (mills)
Deutsches Haus, gathering and event hall in the town core
Flensburg station (Main Railway Station), completed in 1929
Town Hall, seventeen-floor cube from 1964, in 1997 totally renovated
Altes Gymnasium, built in 1914, Flensburg's oldest Gymnasium, founded in 1566 as "Gymnasium trilingue" (Latin, Greek, Hebrew)
Duborg Skolen, Flensburg's Danish Gymnasium, as well as other school buildings

Lost buildings
Gertrudenkirche, church in the Ramsharde (former neighbourhood where Neustadt now stands), folded after the Reformation, graveyard maintained until 1822
Jürgen-Hospital, abandoned after the Reformation, the new St. Jürgen-Kirche stands there today
Old Town Hall, 15th century, demolished in 1883
Government building, appellate court and house of the estates, from 1850 to 1864 political centre of the Duchy of Schleswig, gave way to a department store in 1964
Speicher Johannisstraße 78 (warehouse), bombed in 1945
Town fortifications

Others

 Flensburg Fjord
 Old Cemetery, parkland with noteworthy grave markers from the 19th century
 Christiansenspark, remnant of a very big landscape park
 Volkspark in the town's east end
 Marienhölzung (Danish Frueskov), woods in the town's west end

Regular events

May/June: Rumregatta (yearly)
May/June: Danske Årsmøder (yearly)
 June/December: Campusfete (twice yearly)
 June: Rote-Straße-Fest (yearly)
July: Dampf-Rundum (every two years)
 July/August: Flensburger Hofkultur (yearly summer cultural programme)
August: Flensburger Tummelum (Old Town Festival) (every two years)
October: Apfelfahrt des Museumshafen (yearly)
October: "Flensburg Shortfilmfestival" (yearly)
December: Christmas market (yearly)

Notable people

Honorary citizens

The town of Flensburg has bestowed honorary citizenship upon the following persons, listed chronologically:

 1851: Friedrich Ferdinand Tillisch, Minister for the Duchy of Schleswig
 1857: Christian Rønnenkamp, salesman and shipowner
 1867: Edwin Freiherr von Manteuffel, Prussian King's Governor
 1872: Karl von Wrangel, General
 1895: Otto Fürst von Bismarck, Reich Chancellor
 1911: Friedrich Wilhelm Selck, Commercial Councillor
 1917: Heinrich Schuldt, Town Councillor
 1924: Dr. Hugo Eckener, Aviation pioneer
 1930: Dr. Hermann Bendix Todsen, Oberbürgermeister
 1999: Beate Uhse-Rotermund, aviator and businesswoman

Special Resident

 Isted Lion (unveiled 1862) a war monument, originally in Flensburg, then Berlin, then Copenhagen, now resident again in Flensburg

Sons and daughters of the town

The arts 

 Melchior Lorck (1526/27 – after 1583), a renaissance painter, draughtsman and printmaker
 Heinrich Jansen (1625–1667), Danish Baroque painter, court painter to Frederick III of Denmark
 Caius Gabriel Cibber (1630–1700), Danish sculptor,  appointed carver to the king's closet by William III of England
 Hermann Vogel (1856–1918), French painter and illustrator, from the Duchy of Schleswig 
 Ludwig Dettmann (1865–1944), a German impressionist painter
 Hans Christiansen (1866–1945), artistic craftsman and Art Nouveau founder
 Elvira Madigan (1867–1889), stage name of a Danish tightrope walker and trick rider, whose illicit affair and dramatic death were the subject of the 1967 Swedish film
 Ella Heide (1871–1956), Danish painter, painted in Skagen from 1908
 Wilhelm von Brincken (1881–1946), American character actor and German spy during WW I 
 Emmy Hennings (1885–1948), writer, performer, poet and dadaist
 Dieter Thomas Heck (born 1937), German television presenter, singer and actor
 Pippa Steel (1948–1992), British actress 
 Peter Lund (born 1965), a theatre director and author

Music 
 Carla Spletter (1911–1953), German operatic soprano
 Frank Dostal (born 1945), German songwriter and music producer and was a singer with the rock bands The Rattles
 Christian Broecking (born 1957), musicologist, music critic, columnist, producer and author
 Andreas Delfs (born 1959), conductor laureate of the Milwaukee Symphony Orchestra
 Dorothea Röschmann (born 1967), opera soprano
 DJ Koze (born 1972), German DJ and music producer
 Kim Frank (born 1982), singer and actor
 Ingrid Verena Timm (born 1985), taus player, singer, musicologist and teacher

Science and religion 

 Lütke Namens (1497–1574), the last Franciscan friar in Flensburg and critic of the Reformation
 Thomas Fincke (1561–1656), Danish mathematician and physicist, and a professor at the University of Copenhagen
 Heinrich Harries (1762–1802), German Protestant pastor from the Duchy of Schleswig
 Hans Lassen Martensen (1808–1884) a Danish bishop and academic
 Theodor von Jürgensen (1840–1907), an internist, regards pneumonia and measles.
 Dr Hugo Eckener (1868–1954), pioneer of German Zeppelin aviation.
 Carl Wilhelm Otto Werner (1879–1936), German physician, after whom Werner syndrome, a form of progeria, was named
 Hans Asmussen (1898—1968), was a German Evangelical and Lutheran theologian
 Lorenz Magaard (born 1934), German-American mathematician and oceanographer
 Tim Clausen (born 1969), structural biologist in Vienna, studies pyridoxal phosphate enzymes.

Political and public service 

 Hans Nansen (1598–1667), Danish statesman  and tradesman, travelled to the White Sea, northern Russia and Iceland
 Johan Lorensen (ca.1640–1702), Governor-General of The Danish West Indies 1689-1702
 Christian V (1646–1699) king of Denmark and Norway from 1670 until 1699.
 Princess Anna Sophie of Denmark (1647–1717), daughter of King Frederick III of Denmark
 Frederik Krag (1655–1728), a Danish nobleman, senior civil servant and Governor-General of Norway 1713–1722
 Johannes Moller (1661–1725), a Danish pietist and headmaster
 Georg Waitz (1813–1886), German historian  politician and disciple of Leopold von Ranke.
 Marie Kruse (1842–1923), a Danish schoolteacher, specialized in educating of girls
 Friedrich von Scholtz (1851–1927), general, served in the East and in the Balkans during WWI
 Nicholas Asmussen (1871–1941), Flensburg-born Ontario building contractor and political figure
 Peter Voss (1897–1976), was an SS-Oberscharführer, commander of the crematoria and gas chambers at Auschwitz
 Hans von Luck (1911–1997), army colonel and author the book Panzer Commander.
 Kay Nehm (born 1941), German lawyer, served as Attorney General of Germany 1994 / 2006
 Wolfgang Börnsen (born 1942), CDU politician, member of the Bundestag from 1987 to 2013
 Jürgen Storbeck (born 1946), director of Europol 1999 to 2005
 Bärbel Höhn (born 1952), German politician, member of the Bundestag since 2005 
 Klaus Tscheuschner (born 1956), Lord Mayor of Flensburg 2005 to 2011
 Simon Faber (born 1968), German politician and Lord Mayor of Flensburg since 2011

Sport 
 Charles Meyer (1868–1931), Danish racing cyclist
 Haide Klüglein (born 1939), swimmer
 Kristian Poulsen (born 1975), Danish racing driver
 Sascha Görres (born 1980), footballer in USA, 230 appearances for the Richmond Kickers
 Kolja Afriyie (born 1982), former professional football defender, over 240 pro appearances
 Niels Hansen (born 1983), retired football midfielder, over 200 pro appearances
 Pierre Becken (born 1987), footballer, over 230 pro appearances

See also
 Flensburg, Minnesota
 Isted Lion, in German known as the Flensburger Löwe
 Chronicle of the Expulsion of the Grayfriars#Chapter 1 Concerning the Friary in Flensborg
 SG Flensburg-Handewitt

References
Notes

External links

 Flensburg's official website
 Flensburg tourism information 
 Flensburg online
 Danish newspaper in Flensburg
 German newspaper in Flensburg
 Museumsberg Flensburg

 
Towns in Schleswig-Holstein
Port cities and towns of the Baltic Sea
Populated coastal places in Germany (Baltic Sea)